The International Journal of Surgery (IJS), formerly known as The Journal of Surgery, is a peer-reviewed medical journal of surgery established in 2003. The journal has been published by Elsevier since 2005. The journal is affiliated with the Association of Surgeons in Training, the New York Surgical Society and with the Chinese chapter of the International Hepato-Pancreato-Biliary Association. The journal is published monthly, and articles become open-access after an embargo period of 12 months.

Indexing 
The journal is indexed and abstracted in:

Impact Factor 
IJS impact factor trend is constantly increasing. The impact factor is constantly increasing (1.66 in 2015; 2.21 in 2016; 2.69 in 2017; 3.16 in 2018; 3.36 in 2019 and 6.071 in 2020). The increase from 2016 to 2017 was 17.9% and from 2017 to 2018 was 14.7%   In 2018, IJS is ranked in Q1 (field Surgery). In 2019 it is 40th out of 210 surgical journals rising to 15th in 2020. CiteScore 6.0, SCImago Journal Rank (SJR) 1.139.

Harold Ellis Prize 
Since 2004, the journal has annually awarded the Harold Ellis Prize "in recognition of scientific papers judged
to be outstanding". Harold Ellis CBE FRCS is Emeritus Professor of Surgery in the University of London and currently a professor in the Department of Anatomy & Human Sciences at King's College London. The recipients of the awards are:

 2020 - Robert Rutledge, Kuldeepak Kular, Naveen Manchanda for ''The Mini-Gastric Bypass original technique''
 2019 - James C Glasbey, Rhiannon L Harries, Andrew J Beamish, Vimal JGokani, Helen Mohan, Adam P Williams, Project steering group (James C Glasbey, Simon Fleming, Adam P Williams), ASiT/BOTA Lost Tribe Study Group for ''Early years postgraduate surgical training programmes in the UK are failing to meet national quality standards: An analysis from the ASiT/BOTA Lost Tribe prospective cohort study of 2,569 surgical trainees''
 2018 - Paul Lorenz Bigliardi, Syed Abdul LatiffAlsagoff, Hossam Yehia El-Kafrawi, Jai-Kyong Pyon, Chad Tse Cheuk Wa, Martin Anthony Villa for ''Povidone iodine in wound healing: A review of current concepts and practices''

2017 - Riaz A. Agha, Alexander J. Fowler, Alexandra Saeta, Ishani Barai, Shivanchan Rajmohan, Dennis P. Orgill for "The SCARE Statement: Consensus-based surgical case report guidelines"
2015 - Michal Pedziwiatr, Mikhail Kisialeuski, Mateusz Wierdak, Maciej Stanek, Michal Natkaniec, Maciej Matlok, Piotr Major, Piotr Malczak, Andrzej Budzynski for "Early implementation of Enhanced Recovery After Surgery (ERAS®) protocol – Compliance improves outcomes: A prospective cohort study"
2014 - Oliver J. Muensterer, Martin Lacher, Christoph Zoeller, Matthew Bronstein, Joachim Kübler for "Google Glass in pediatric surgery: An exploratory study"
2013 - N. A. O'Regan, J. Fitzgerald, S. Timmons, H. O'Connell, D. Meagher for "Delirium: A key challenge for perioperative care"
2012 - Holger Keil, Wolf Mueller, Christel Herold-Mende, Martha Maria Gebhard, Günter Germann, Holger Engel, Matthias A. Reichenberger for "Preoperative shock wave treatment enhances ischemic tissue survival, blood flow and angiogenesis in a rat skin flap model"
2011 - Muhammad Imran Aslam, Ashish Kelkar, David Sharpe, John Stuart Jameson for "Ten years experience of managing the primary tumours in patients with stage IV colorectal cancers"
2010 - Saleh El-Awadi, Ayman El-Nakeeb et al. for "Laparoscopic versus open cholecystectomy in cirrhotic patients: A prospective randomized study"
2009 - Colin A. Walsh, Tjun Tang, Stewart R. Walsh for "Laparoscopic versus open appendicectomy in pregnancy: A systematic review"
2008 - Agha R, Cooper D, Muir G for "The reporting quality of randomised controlled trials in surgery: A systematic review"
2007 - Thomas Schlich for "Nobel Prizes for surgeons: In recognition of the surgical healing strategy"
2006 - S. Alam Hannan for "The magnificent seven: a history of modern thyroid surgery"
2005 - Not awarded
2004 - J. Whittle for "Preoperative Anthropometric Analysis of the Cleft Child’s Face: A Comparison between Groups"

Sister journals

International Journal of Surgery Case Reports  
International Journal of Surgery Case Reports is dedicated to publishing open access surgical case reports. Editor-in-Chief: David Rosin.

CiteScore 1.0, SCImago Journal Rank (SJR) 0.233.

The journal annually awards the Thomas Starzl Prize, won by

2017 - Obinna Obinwa, David Cooper, James M. O’Riordan An ingested mobile phone in the stomach may not be amenable to safe endoscopic removal using current therapeutic devices: A case report

2015 Mustafa Pehlivan, Pelin Özün Özbay, Muzaffer Temur, Özgür Yilmaz, Zekeriya Gümüs, Ahmet Güzel Epidermal cyst in an unusual site: A case report

2014 - B. Patrice Mwipatayi, Chee Weng Leong, Pradeep Subramanian, Alarick Picardo for "En bloc kidney transplant from an 18-month-old donor to an adult recipient: Case report and literature review"
2013 - Mohammed Al Mohaidly, Ahmed Suliman and Horia Malawi for "Laparoscopic sleeve gastrectomy for a two-and half year old morbidly obese child"

International Journal of Surgery Open 
International Journal of Surgery Open is a fully open access journal of surgery. Editor-in-Chief: D. Rosin

CiteScore 0.6, SCImago Journal Rank (SJR) 0.21

References 

Surgery journals
Publications established in 2003
Elsevier academic journals
English-language journals
Monthly journals